Buddy is an indie pop group from Los Angeles formed in 2006 and named after the lead singer.

History 

Sometimes to find the real beginning of something you have to begin again. After the release of the band's  debut album, Alterations and Repairs, in 2007, the musicians were riding high, encouraged by  the response to the music so far. Formed by Buddy, a Portland-born musician who relocated  to Los Angeles in 2002, the band evolved from an acoustic project to a full-fledged rock  outfit. It was an aesthetic that the group, which came together in 2006 when Buddy was asked  to open for Tommy Stinson but couldn't play guitar with a broken arm and needed a backing  band, honed during their live shows on stages around LA and on tour across the country for  several years. So when Buddy began writing material for a second full-length the musical  goals felt fuzzy, the lines between acoustic singer-songwriter and rock band blurred. Buddy  and his band recorded an entire new album in 2009 and, after touring with Gomez in 2010,  determined to scrap it.

"The first record came together very naturally," Buddy says. "But on this second record I felt  like I was not as sure of myself or what I was doing. I felt like I was riding this wave of  energy but not really sure how it felt at the end of the day. I liked the record but it didn't feel  authentically me. I think we had an identity crisis. It was a hard decision to put it aside because we had spent a ton of time on it, but there was something missing. I had a responsibility to really stand behind something and focus on the longevity of the project. It should be the best we could do and this wasn't it. It was really risky. It stopped everything."

Buddy spent the next year feeling lost, uncertain how to proceed with the band, unsure of where to take the music. He was searching for a new beginning, one that felt organic to him as a musician. It turned out that collaboration was the key to hitting the restart button. Five tracks from the unreleased album did eventually emerge in 2012 as the Campfire EP, but Buddy needed a new inspiration for his second album. In 2012, Buddy and Will started writing and recording together in Los Angeles. It was a harmonious partnership, with Will leading the charge on much of the album's production. The songs were bigger and fuller, propelled by more electronic elements than Buddy had previously employed.

"Buddy's songs are very personal to him and he puts so much of himself into them," Will says. "So I understood why he felt like it wasn't working but at the end of the day I think we still learned a lot from it. It was really nice to get in and work together. It was late nights. We would just show up every day. We wrote over 30 songs. We could sift through those and decide what would work. It was simple and really easy. These songs represent Buddy really well and show how he's grown as a songwriter."

The album itself, Last Call For The Quiet Life, reflects Buddy's struggle and reconciliation with himself over the past few years. For him, the songs are a sort of confessional therapy, a place to channel the issues and ideas that plague his mind. One song, "Anchor," even began as a poem Buddy had written, which was a new method of songwriting for him. The album's title is derived from a line in the album's first track, embodying the idea that you never know how long the window of opportunity will be open. The music itself embraces a more up-tempo rock vibe that reflects Buddy's live performance, each instrument layering together to create a buoyant but introspective indie pop vibe.

The disc features several guest musicians, including Michelle Branch, Cary Brothers and Holly Conlan, who lend their voices to the soaring melodies. The duo finished recording the album in early 2013 and went to Seattle in February and March to mix the record with Phil Ek at Avast Studios. The album was mastered by Greg Calbi at Sterling Sound in March 2013 in New York City. The final album is a strikingly evocative collection of songs that represents the musicians who made it. From shimmering opener "Weak Currents" to sparsely wrought closer "Scrap Metal," Last Call For The Quiet Life contains the ups and downs of existence  and relationships and family, and the highs and lows of finding yourself in your own life.  Each note resonates with its own emotion, creating an overall narrative of what it means to  find the right beginning. Or, to let it find us.     "When you start something you don't know where it's going to go," Buddy says. "The whole  record felt like solid footing right away. It wasn't anguished over. We just did what we both  do. I needed to feel scared and not know where it was going. I had to learn to just let it happen  and let it keep unfolding. When you do that, suddenly you have these songs and they all go  together."

Band members 
Buddy – Vocals, Guitar
Will Golden – Bass/Guitar (Gary Jules, Cougar Town)
Al Sgro – Drums (Gary Jules, Cougar Town)
Fil Krohnengold – Keyboards/Guitar (Sara Bareilles, Golden Smog, Duncan Sheik, Operation Aloha)
Percy Haverson Guitar (Knifeyhead aka Walk Evil Talk)

Additional members
Holly Conlan – Vocals, Keys
Michael Jerome – Drums (John Cale, Better than Ezra)
Michael Tritter – Analog Sounds
Oli Krause – Strings (Sia, Gomez, Rachael Yamagata)

Discography

Albums 
"Last Call For The Quiet Life" (August 19, 2014) · (Stove Punchin', USA) – CD/LP/VINYL #SPRLP02
Lighten up Francis' – unreleasedAlterations and Repairs (2010) · (Moorworks, Japan) – CD/LPAlterations and Repairs (2007) · (Stove Punchin', USA) – CD/LP

"Last Call For The Quiet Life"
August 19, 2014. All Songs Written by – Buddy and Will Golden  Produced by – Will Golden  Recorded and Engineered by – Will Golden at The Chalet – Los Angeles, CA  Drums Recorded and Engineered by – Clay Blair at Boulevard Recording – Los Angeles, CA  Assisted by – Brian McPhillips  Mixed by – Phil Ek at Avast! - Seattle, WA  Mastered by – Greg Calbi at Sterling Sound – New York, NY  Buddy – vocals, guitars, synths  Will Golden – bass, guitars, synths, background vocals     Additional Musicians:  Guitars: Percy Mamikunian (tracks 1, 2, 3, 5, 6, 9), Phil Krohnengold (1, 4), Jeramy Koepping (1), Brandon  Walters (7, 8)  Synths: Michael Tritter (all tracks), Phil Krohnengold (2, 3, 6, 9), Nick White (10)  Drums: Michael Jerome (1,3, 4, 5, 8), Frederick Bokkenheuser (2, 6, 7, 9, 10), David Palmer (10)  Percussion: Al Sgro (all tracks)  Bass: Joe Karnes (all tracks)  Cellos: Oli Kraus (4, 8, 9)  Vocals: Holly Conlan (1, 2, 3, 5, 6, 9), Michelle Branch (7, 8), Ian Ball (2, 4, 6), Cary Brothers (2, 3, 5)  Group Vocals:  Morgan Nagler (2, 4, 5), Jake Bellowes (2, 4, 5), Jiha Lee (2, 4, 5), Nick White (2, 4, 5), Percy Mamikunian (4), Graham Kurzner (4), Ever Golden (5)    Cover art Illustrations by: Sprankenstein, London, UK. Layout by: Bait and Tackle Studios Los Angeles, CA.

Weak Current
Slow Light Down
Fault Lines
Boxing Elbows
Behind It (Bad Advice)
Anchor
Anywhere You Go
Stare Too Long
Frames Per Second
Scrap Metal

"Alterations and Repairs"
Released June 26, 2007. Additional musicians/vocalists: Anna-Lynne Williams (Trespassers William), Ben Peeler (Alexi Murdoch), Meiko, Ollie (Sia, Tom McRae). Mixed by Bryan Cook (Inara George, The Bird & The Bee, Gary Jules) and mastered by Roger Siebel (Death Cab for Cutie/Plans). Artwork by PCP (The Postal Service).
"Say a Lot"
"Westgate"
"Apologize (If You Tried)"
"Blindsides"
"Color Patterns"
"11/22"
"No Heart"
"Never Timed Just Right"
"If We Lived Here"
"Silent Treatment"
"Regular Time"
"Last Call Waiting"
"My Left Your Right (Feat. Meiko)" Japan LP Release only 2010, Single released digitally on iTunes 2012.

 Singles and EPs 
"My Left Your Right" (2012) – (Stove Punchin' Records) – Digital/Single
"campfire" (2012) – Stove Punchin' Records – EP – Featured on iTunes "Discover this", "Indie Spotlight", "New & Noteworthy", the single "campfire" was featured by KCRW in their Song of the Day, and placed in the feature film Waiting for Ophelia and "lighthouse" was featured on Drop Dead Diva. Additional musicians/vocalists: Ian Ball & Ben Ottewell (Gomez), Cary Brothers, Jesse Carmichael (Maroon 5), Laura Jansen, actor/musician Brendan Hines, holly Conlan. Produced by buddy, will golden and Ian ball. Mixed by Brian Deck.
"Sun" (2011) – Stove Punchin' Records – EP – limited edition hand-painted sleeve EP, no more exist.More of the Shame (2005) · (self-released) – SingleBuddy (2005) · (self-released) – CD EP
"Braddock"
"Make Believe In You"
"Be Like This"
"Salt Point"
"Milkshake"
"Valentine, Nebraska"
"Regular Time"Side By Side – Duets Vol. 1'' (2008) · (Hear Me Sing) – duet performed with AM

Compilations & Covers 
"The Big C" (2011) (Sony Musc) charity album from the Showtime series – Track: "Say a Lot" – CD/LP
"Indie Translations of Usher" (2005) (Urabon Records/Vitaman Records) – Track: "Bad Girl" – CD/LP
"Perfect As Cats: A Tribute to the Cure" (2008) (Manimal Vinyl) – Track: "Sugar Girl" – 2Disk LP

Film and Television 
Looking For Alaska (TV series) (2019) – Mini Series – Ep.1 Famous Last Words – Song Featured: "Milkshake"
Where We're Meant to Be (2016) – Feature Film – Song Featured: "11/22"
Warren (2014) Feature Film – Song Featured – "Boxing Elbows"
Community (2012) NBC – Comedy TV Show – Song Featured – "11/22"
What a Man (2011) Fox Searchlight – German Comedy – Song Featured: "Regular Time"
Tower Prep (2010) Cartoon Network- ep. 10 phone home – song Featured: "11/22"
The Big C (2010) Showtime – ep. 7, Song Featured: "Say A Lot"
Waiting for Ophelia (2010) (Feature Film) – IFC – Song Featured: "Campfire".
Wake (2009) (Feature Film) – E1 Entertainment – Song Featured: "Say A Lot"
Cougar Town (2009) – ABC – Song Featured: "Campfire".
Drop Dead Diva (2009) – Lifetime Network – Song Featured: "lighthouse".
Ghost Whisperer (2009) – CBS – Song featured: "Is It Cold In Silver Lake?".
Ghost Whisperer (2007) – CBS – Song featured: "Regular Time".
One Tree Hill (2005, 2006, 2007) – The WB & The CW – Episode No. 304 featured "More Of The Shame"; episode No. 319 featured "Don't Go Home"; episode No. 402 featured "Westgate"; episode No. 408 featured "11/22"; episode No. 415 featured "Blindsides"
MTV's Road Rules (2007) – ep. 1407 – Aired 03/13/07 – Song featured: "Last Call Waiting"
Shelter from the Storm: A Concert for the Gulf Coast (2006) – Song featured: "Salt Point"

Press 
"Buddy writes some of the prettiest, catchiest melodic pop songs I've heard in a long time.  Be the first of your friends to discover him." Elise from SomaFM's Indie Pop Rock show.
"But one-named newcomer Buddy made up for it by delivering "I'm Still Standing", as if he were about to crumble into dust. His quiet resolve communicated an entirely different kind of strength. Like the best performances here, this proved a great song can take any makeover." Jim Farber, New York Daily News
"One of the most beautiful tenors to find my ears. Heart-stopping lyrics and melodies". Tom Morello (Audioslave/Rage Against the Machine)
"Buddy's sincere, soft, melancholy style is irresistible, infectious, and emotionally powerful." Impact Press
Los Angeles Times: High on the Buddy List.

Trivia 
Buddy has covered these songs live or on record: Kelis's "Milkshake", The Lemonheads's "Confetti", ZZ Top's "Legs", "Get Your Hands Off of My Woman" by The Darkness, "Ghost In You" by The Psychedelic Furs, "I'm Still Standing" by Elton John and "Polar Opposites" by Modest Mouse.

External links 
One Tree Hill Music
MTV's Road Rules Site
Urabon Records Official Site
Is good...music

Indie rock musical groups from California
Musical groups from Los Angeles